The List of shipwrecks in 1788 includes some ships sunk, wrecked or otherwise lost during 1788.

January

7 January

17 January

18 January

21 January

Unknown date

February

14 February

Unknown date

March

5 March

14 March

23 March

Unknown date

April

1 April

3 April

28 April

Unknown date

May

3 May

16 May

Unknown date

June

7 June

Unknown date

July

22 July

23 July

24 July

Unknown date

August

10 August

16 August

Unknown date

September

20 September

28 September

Unknown date

October

5 October

9 October

11 October

24 October

Unknown date

November

3 November

5 November

6 November

14 November

15 November

19 November

27 November

28 November

30 November

Unknown date

December

2 December

3 December

6 December

7 December

9 December

11 December

14 December

16 December

23 December

29 December

31 December

Unknown date

Unknown date

References

1788